Thống Nhất may refer to several places in Vietnam, including:

Thống Nhất, Biên Hòa, a ward of Biên Hòa
Thống Nhất district, a district of Đồng Nai province
Thống Nhất Stadium, a stadium in Ho Chi Minh city